Vinopedia.hr is a Croatian online wine encyclopedia.

Vinopedia.hr was launched in 2008 by Ivan Sokolić (1930–2014), one of the most prominent Croatian enologists and wine writers. Its content is based on the Grand Lexicon of Viticulture and Vinification, Sokolić's 580-page reference work published in 2006.

, Vinopedia had 2,232 articles, and had amassed a total of 2.355 million page views. Translation of content to English, German and Italian is planned, followed by French and Russian.

References

Croatian online encyclopedias
2008 establishments in Croatia
Internet properties established in 2008
Wine websites
MediaWiki websites
Croatian wine
Croatian-language websites
21st-century encyclopedias